Timothy Bruce Schmit (born October 30, 1947) is an American musician, singer, and songwriter. He has performed as the bassist and vocalist for Poco and the Eagles, having replaced bassist and vocalist Randy Meisner in both cases. Schmit has also worked for decades as a session musician and solo artist. In 1998, he was inducted into the Rock and Roll Hall of Fame as a member of the Eagles.

Early life 
Schmit was born in Oakland, California. He was raised in Sacramento, and began playing in the folk music group Tim, Tom & Ron at the age of 15. That group evolved into a surf band called the Contenders, then changed its name to the New Breed (sometimes known simply as "the Breed"). As the New Breed, they had a major local hit in Sacramento: the Animals-inspired "Green Eyed Woman," which was released in 1965 and hit No. 1 on local top-40 outlet KXOA. (The track also charted on isolated stations in Virginia and Indiana.)  A few more local-only hits followed, before the group changed its name once again to Glad.  The group recorded the album Feelin' Glad in 1968.

Poco 

In 1968, Schmit auditioned for Poco but was turned down in favor of founding member Randy Meisner. When Meisner quit the band in 1969, Schmit replaced him on bass and vocals. He appeared on nine of Poco's studio albums and two live albums between 1969 and 1977, composing numerous songs. He wrote and was the lead singer on the song "Keep on Tryin'," Poco's biggest hit single to that point, peaking at No. 50 on the Billboard Hot 100 in 1975. Apart from Poco, Schmit also contributed vocals to Firefall's 1977 hit, "Just Remember I Love You."

Schmit sang backing vocals on the Steely Dan albums Pretzel Logic, The Royal Scam and Aja. Schmit also sang backing vocals on "Never Let Her Slip Away", a top 5 UK hit for Andrew Gold in 1978, along with Brock Walsh, J.D. Souther and an uncredited Freddie Mercury. In 1974, Schmit played bass alongside Glenn Frey and Don Henley on the song "You Can Close Your Eyes" featured on Linda Ronstadt's album Heart Like a Wheel.

Eagles

In 1977, Schmit joined the Eagles during the Hotel California tour, replacing Randy Meisner on bass/vocals, as he had done in Poco, after Meisner quit. Although the Eagles are thought of as a quintessential California band, Schmit is the only member of the group who is actually a native of California.

On their 1979 album, The Long Run, Schmit co-wrote and sang lead vocals on the song "I Can't Tell You Why". The band later broke up in 1980 and reunited 14 years later, with Schmit singing the lead vocals on "Love Will Keep Us Alive" on the reunion album Hell Freezes Over.

In 2007, the Eagles released a new album, Long Road Out of Eden. Schmit continued to be part of the Eagles lineup along with Don Henley, Glenn Frey, and Joe Walsh until Frey's death in 2016 and is in the current Eagles touring lineup featuring Vince Gill.

Career after the Eagles and Poco
After the Eagles broke up in 1980, Schmit embarked on a solo career, singing vocals and playing bass for hire during studio sessions. His voice can be heard on many hits, including Bob Seger's "Fire Lake" and Boz Scaggs' "Look What You've Done to Me" (each with Frey and Henley), Don Felder's "Heavy Metal (Takin' a Ride)" (with Henley), and Crosby, Stills and Nash's "Southern Cross" and "Wasted on the Way", where he sang harmony. He was also a background musician on two of Don Henley's hit songs, "Dirty Laundry" and "You Don't Know Me at All". He sang a cover of The Tymes' "So Much in Love" on the soundtrack to the film "Fast Times at Ridgemont High."

Schmit teamed with his predecessor in both Poco and the Eagles, Randy Meisner, along with their mutual Eagles bandmate Joe Walsh, to provide background vocals to the Richard Marx 1987 hit "Don't Mean Nothing". Schmit also performed on the Toto 1983 hit singles "I Won't Hold You Back" and "Africa", and the Jars of Clay song "Everything in Between". He also played on the 1983 Glenn Shorrock solo album. He sang harmony and backing vocals on Dan Fogelberg's 1984 project Windows and Walls. In 1991 Schmit covered the standard "I Only Have Eyes for You" for the soundtrack of the film Don't Tell Mom the Babysitter's Dead. In 1988 he added background vocals to Sheena Easton's album The Lover in Me and in 1989 Schmit added background vocals on the Stacey Q single, "Heartbeat", which was featured on her Nights Like This album. He also sang background vocals on the America album Alibi.

Schmit toured with Toto in 1982 and with Jimmy Buffett in 1983, 1984, and 1985 as a member of the Coral Reefer Band and coined the term "Parrotheads" to describe Buffett's fans. He was a member of Ringo Starr & His All-Starr Band in 1992. In 1993, he contributed background vocals to several tracks on Clint Black's No Time to Kill CD including the title cut. In 1995, Schmit sang the song "How Far I'll Fly" for the ending credits to the Australian movie Napoleon. In 1996, he sang on a cover version of The Beach Boys' song "Caroline, No" on their album Stars and Stripes Vol. 1, with the Beach Boys themselves contributing harmonies. In 2000, he toured with Dan Fogelberg; recordings from that tour became a live album, Dan Fogelberg Live. Schmit sang harmony on the title track of Katy Rose's debut album, Because I Can, produced by fellow Poco alumnus and Katy's father, Kim Bullard.

Schmit's fifth studio album, Expando, was released in October 2009. In May 2012, Schmit was awarded an Honorary Doctorate of Music from the Berklee College of Music. His sixth studio album Leap of Faith was released on September 23, 2016, the first release of an Eagles member since the death of bandmate Glenn Frey in January 2016. His seventh studio album Day by Day was released on May 6, 2022.

Personal life
Schmit has three children: a daughter by his first wife and a daughter and son by his present wife. He was successfully treated for throat and neck cancer in late 2012.

Discography

Studio albums

Singles

References

External links
 

1947 births
American rock bass guitarists
Living people
Musicians from Oakland, California
Eagles (band) members
Poco members
MCA Records artists
Universal Records artists
Lost Highway Records artists
Kennedy Center honorees
American session musicians
American male singer-songwriters
American country bass guitarists
American male bass guitarists
American country rock singers
American country singer-songwriters
American rock singers
Guitarists from California
20th-century American guitarists
Coral Reefer Band members
Ringo Starr & His All-Starr Band members
Singer-songwriters from California